The Little Cranberry River is an  river in Ontonagon County, on the Upper Peninsula of Michigan, in the United States. It is a tributary of Lake Superior.

See also
List of rivers of Michigan

References

Michigan  Streamflow Data from the USGS

Rivers of Michigan
Tributaries of Lake Superior